The Anglican Church Grammar School (ACGS), formerly the Church of England Grammar School and commonly referred to as Churchie, is an independent, Anglican, day and boarding school for boys, located in East Brisbane, an inner suburb of Brisbane, Queensland, Australia.

Founded in 1912 by Canon William Perry French Morris, Churchie has a non-selective enrolment policy and currently caters for approximately 1,800 students from Reception to Year 12, including 150 boarders from Years 7 to 12. It is owned by the Corporation of the Synod of the Diocese of Brisbane.

Churchie is a founding member of the Great Public Schools Association of Queensland (GPS), and is affiliated with the Association of Heads of Independent Schools of Australia (AHISA), the Independent Primary School Heads of Australia (IPSHA), Independent Schools Queensland (ISQ), the Headmasters' and Headmistresses' Conference (HMC) and the Australian Boarding Schools' Association (ABSA). Churchie is also an International Baccalaureate World School offering the Diploma Programme and Primary Years Programme.

Churchie, widely recognised as one of Brisbane's most prestigious schools, is among Australia's richest based on earnings and donations from alumni. In 2009, the school raised $30.9 million in fees, charges, parent contributions and other private sources, 26.5 per cent more than any other school in southeast Queensland. In the same year, Churchie also received $7.7 million in donations, primarily from alumni. This figure was the second highest in Australia, surpassed only by the donations to Sydney Grammar School.

History
In 1912, Canon William Perry French Morris and his wife (who held degrees in science and medicine) founded a school called St Magnus Hall at Ardencraig, a suburban house in Church Street (now Jephson Street), Toowong, before relocating it to the present site in East Brisbane in 1918.

Canon Morris assigned Saint Magnus, a Norsemen earl, as the patron saint of the school and had hoped that the students would be referred to as 'Magnates'. It is said that he did not like the nickname 'Churchie' at first, however when it had become commonplace by the 1930s and respected around Queensland he accepted the change.

The school's name was changed to St Magnus Hall Collegiate School For Boys and then to The Cathedral School early in 1913 following the move to a new site at St John's Cathedral in the Brisbane central business district. Thirty-three boys completed the school year that year. In 1916, the land that the school currently stands on was purchased and, in 1918, the foundation stone was laid on the school's current site. From 1916 to 1985, the school was officially known as the Church of England Grammar School (CEGS). Prior to the 1985 school year, the school name was officially changed once again to the Anglican Church Grammar School (ACGS), to reflect the 1981 renaming of the Church of England in Australia to the Anglican Church of Australia. However, the school continues to be popularly known as Churchie.

In May 2004, Frederick Roy Hoskins, a former teacher and boarding house head, pleaded guilty to seven child sex offences committed against seven victims aged nine to fifteen between 1947 and 1955. He had taught at the school for ten years.

On the afternoon of 7 December 2007, a fire started in the Lanskey Building between two Year 7 classrooms. The automated fire system set alarms off, and just after 4:30 pm the Queensland Fire and Rescue Service arrived to find two classrooms badly damaged.

During April 2008, there was community debate when students were disallowed from inviting male partners to the school formal. The school's Headmaster referred the matter to the School Council, which released a statement saying that it 'strongly supported the headmaster's position on the school's education programs in social settings'.

In October 2009, the deputy head of the preparatory school, Chris Klemm, was stood down due to 'serious allegations' made against him. The Headmaster issued letters to all parents regarding the matter, but kept the allegation, which was revealed in the mid-semester holiday break, confidential. In November 2010, Klemm was convicted of child sex offences and received a jail sentence of five years.

In late 2009, the school began extensive construction work to upgrade its cultural and sporting facilities. Over two years, three new complexes were built at the school's East Brisbane campus: the Barry McCart Aquatic Centre, the David Turbayne Tennis Centre and the $9.9 million Sir John Pidgeon Sports Complex, opened by Governor Penelope Wensley in 2010. In 2011, Morris Hall, the school's "spiritual heart", was upgraded and expanded and the adjacent quadrangle, Magnus Quad, was also relandscaped.

In October 2016, School House, the oldest building on site and home to the boarding community, was refurbished. The following year The Centenary Library was opened and  housed Student Services, the Senior School library, classrooms and a research centre focusing on learning environments.

Patron saint

Canon Morris based much of the school's ethos on its patron saint, St Magnus, a Norsemen earl known for his strength of character and his qualities as an educated Christian man. The Viking tradition is reflected in the school coat of arms, with its shield and battle axes symbolising Viking courage, and its crossed axes signifying self-sacrifice and St Magnus' martyrdom. Many of the school's rowing boats are named after Viking figures, and the school mascot, 'Eric', is also a Viking effigy.

Headmasters

Campus
Churchie's twenty-two hectare campus is located in inner-city Brisbane. The school occupies the entire eastern side of Oaklands Parade, a street in East Brisbane, and extends all the way down to the banks of Norman Creek, a tributary of the Brisbane River. The first building on the site was the old boarding house, erected in 1918. Most of the school's buildings are built in the Gothic Scholastic style, characterised by 'decorative, half-timbered gables, red brick face-work, gargoyles and terracotta tiles'. Churchie has all of its sporting and cultural facilities on its East Brisbane campus—including ten playing fields, three swimming pools, two basketball courts, seven tennis courts and gymnasium—on the one campus. The Graham Fowles Boathouse is located approximately one kilometre away in Mowbray Park.

Notable buildings and facilities on the Churchie campus include:
 Morris Hall – Churchie's main social, cultural and musical building
 Magnus Hall and Magnus Quadrangle – the school's main academic building
 The Canon Jones Memorial Chapel – the spiritual centre of the school, named after Canon Thomas Jones, an early supporter of the school. Canon Morris' remains are interred under the chapel's altar
 Darnell – originally the school library, now the School Council Room and The Old Boys Room
 School House – the school's oldest building and boarding headquarters
 The Sir John Pidgeon Sports Complex – contains the school's basketball courts, volleyball courts and gymnasium
 The Hayward Midson Creative Precinct – home to Visual Art, Film and TV and Design and Technology faculties
 The Centenary Library – comprising the Senior School Library, Churchie IT, Student Services, Churchie Archives and museum, Mawson House, the Churchie Research Centre, Churchie Learning Support, The Arches café and various classrooms and multipurpose study spaces.
 The 'Pocket' – a triangle of land bordered by Norman Creek that contains six of the school's playing fields, including the Main Oval

Curriculum

Academic
Churchie provides a scholastic environment based on personalised academic pathways for every student developed through academic profiling and examination of each student's individual needs. The school's approach is strongly influenced by the values and writings of Canon Morris, the school's founder, who believed boys needed a clear sense of what was right – honesty, integrity, perseverance, patience, courage and courtesy.

Churchie is involved in a number of educational research programmes carried out by various Australian universities, including the universities of Melbourne and Swinburne University of Technology. Its new generation learning space and emotional intelligence programmes are examples of such research-led initiatives.

In 2017, Churchie was authorised by the International Baccalaureate Organisation as an IB World School for the delivery of the Diploma Programme and the Primary Years Programme.

Preparatory School
Churchie's Preparatory School comprises Reception to Year 6. Students in Years 4, 5 and 6 must lease from the school their own tablet computer as part of Churchie's tablet computer programme. The subjects available to prep students are:

 English
 Mathematics
 Integrated Studies (Science, Humanities and Social Sciences)
 Music
 Visual Arts
 Health and Physical Education
 LOTE (Japanese)
 Religious Education

Senior School
In 2015, Churchie combined the middle and senior schools into a single Senior School for the secondary school years (7 to 12). Students in Years 7 to 9 use the same curriculum, which focuses on English, mathematics, humanities, science, modern languages (Japanese, Mandarin, Spanish or French), religious education, and health and physical education. Electives include design technology, and visual and media arts, music, drama, geography, engineering technology, advanced science, information technology, film, television and new media and philosophy and critical reasoning. Year 10 is a preparatory year, in which subjects are presented (where possible) as precursors to what can be expected in Years 11 and 12. All subjects are assessed and reported under a criteria-based approach. Year 10 Students study English, mathematics, history, science, religious education, modern languages and history plus three elective subjects. In Years 11 and 12, students study six subjects. English and Mathematics A or Mathematics B are compulsory. The remaining four are drawn from the following list:

 Accounting
 Agricultural Science
 Ancient History
 Biology
 Chemistry
 Drama
 Earth Science
 Economics
 Engineering Technology
 Film, Television and New Media
 Geography
 Information Processing and Technology
 Mathematics C
 Modern History
 Modern languages (Chinese Mandarin, French, Japanese, Spanish)
 Music
 Music Extension (Year 12 only)
 Physical Education
 Physics
 Technology Studies
 Visual Art

Students also receive leadership development training as part of the pastoral learning curriculum and the school's outdoor education programme. Senior students are able to apply their leadership skills during house and co-curricular activities by, for example, mentoring younger students or undertaking duties for the house or School.

Sport
Churchie offers a range of sporting and cultural activities to all students. The school is a member of the Great Public Schools (GPS) sporting competition and competes in most available sports. Boys of all skill levels are given the opportunity to participate in numerous sports, including: basketball, chess, cricket, cross-country, debating, football, rowing, rugby union, swimming, tennis, track and field, volleyball and water polo. Churchie has been highly successful in the GPS sporting competition winning the top GPS school premiership over all competitions 3 years in a row, in 2010, 2011 and 2012. This premiership was known as the Bauman Cup which was first awarded in 1953 and discontinued in 1977. Churchie was awarded the Bauman Cup a record 16 times.

Chess 
Churchie's Premier Chess Team secured the GPS Chess Premiership for two consecutive years in 2018 and 2019.

Cricket 
Churchie has won a total of 19 GPS Cricket Premierships since 1919, including 15 outright and four ties.

Debating 
Churchie has won the GPS Debating Premiership competition three times since it commenced in 2002, winning in 2007, 2012 and 2020.

Football 
In 2019, Churchie's First XI achieved the school's first-ever GPS Football premiership since the competition began in 1991.

Rowing
Churchie's rowing history dates back to its establishment in 1912. Rowing was initially based at the Toowong Rowing Club, near the school's original grounds. Later, in 1917, the school built its own boatshed and rowing facilities at Norman Creek. Shortly after the opening of the Norman Creek boatshed, the school began a rowing competition between day and boarding students, held over a 5/8-mile course, which has been held sporadically since 1920. In 1936, the Elder Hunter boatshed was built on the banks of the Brisbane River in Mowbray Park, East Brisbane. The school's rowing program now operates from the Graham Fowles Boathouse, built in 2005 on the site of the old boatshed.

Since 1918, Churchie has entered both quads and eights in the Queensland Head of the River, Queensland's premier high school rowing competition. From 1918 to 1954, the O'Connor Cup for the Open 1st VIII race was contested in quads. Churchie won the cup six times in quads (1922, 1926, 1936, 1939, 1940 and 1941). Since the introduction of eights in 1955, Churchie has won ten times (1963, 1969, 1971, 1973, 1975, 1998, 2004, 2005, 2010 and 2012). The School has won the Old Boys' Cup, awarded to the school with the greatest number of points, a total of nine times (in 1990, 1991, 1999, 2004, 2005, 2006, 2019, 2020 and 2021) since the award's inception in 1988.

In 2012, the Open 1st VIII participated in the Princess Elizabeth Challenge Cup at the Henley Royal Regatta in the United Kingdom, the first Churchie crew to do so.

Rugby
Initially, rugby league was played by the GPS schools; only in 1928 did they convert to rugby union. With seventeen premierships as of 2014, Churchie has always been one of the strongest schools in the rugby competition. Only Nudgee College has won the premiership a greater number of times. Churchie's 2005 undefeated premiership-winning 1st XV contained two future Australia players: David Pocock and Quade Cooper. Twenty-four Churchie students have been selected for the Australian Schoolboys national rugby union team, the highest level of schoolboy rugby in Australia, since the team's inception in 1973. In 2010, the school was identified as one of the 'nurseries of Australian schoolboy rugby' by the Australian Schools Rugby Union (ASRU). In all, sixteen Churchie boys have gone on to become Wallabies:

 Keith Bell
 Walter Bennett
 Quade Cooper
 David Crombie
 Owen Edwards
 David Hillhouse
 Nigel Holt
Kayln Ponga
 Gavan Horsley
 Kerry Larkin
 Don Lowth
 Lloyd McDermott
 David Pocock
 David Rathie
 David Taylor
 Ross Teitzel
 Ric Trivett

Swimming 
Churchie won both the Senior and Junior GPS Swimming Championships in 2014. In 2015, Churchie won the Junior GPS Swimming Championships (10 Years & Under to 12 Years & Under).

Tennis 
Churchie has won the GPS Tennis Premiership 11 times since the competition began in 1918.

Volleyball 
In 2018, the GPS's centenary year, Churchie secured its third consecutive undefeated GPS Volleyball Premiership. Churchie also won the GPS Volleyball premiership in 1998.

Culture

Music
The school's music program includes a symphony orchestra, an assortment of bands and choirs and a choral dectet. Individual tuition is available for students studying an instrument or voice and speech. Churchie also provides the choristers for St John's Cathedral.

In July 2000, the Churchie Symphony Orchestra performed the prelude music and the national anthem at A Service for Australia in Westminster Abbey, London, to commemorate the Federation of Australia.

Churchie runs annual musicals in conjunction with Somerville House. Productions have included Peter Pan (2017), Grease (2016), Alice in Wonderland (2015), How to Succeed in Business Without Really Trying (2014), The Sound of Music (2013) and Oliver! (2012). The Stage Crew is a group of school students who work on productions, assemblies, service events, dances and other activities that require technical organisation.

Art and media

Each year, the school showcases the work of its Film, TV and New Media students at the Churchie Awards in Media (CAM). Similarly, Visual Art students display their work at CART, the Churchie Art showcase.

The churchie national emerging art prize was established in 1987 as an initiative of the school. From 2010 until 2019, the school had a partnership with the Griffith University Art Gallery at the Queensland College of Art, with staff members from the school sitting on the committee  as well as developing educational materials to complement the exhibition of finalists, aimed at school-age students as of 2013.

Service 
Community service, along with scholastic attainment, spiritual awareness and personal growth, is one of the four tenets of the school. Churchie students are regularly involved in a number of charitable events including doorknocks, fundraisers (especially for the Leukaemia Foundation's World's Greatest Shave), nursing home visits and mobile Blood Bank donations. The school also conducts international service tours where students assist local schools and community organisations. Recent international service tours have visited India, China, Vanuatu and Samoa. On the final day of Term two, a Prep School Billy Cart Race is held to support World Vision. One of the most important service activities for the year is the Sony Foundation Children's Holiday Camp Program, where students from Years Eleven and Twelve care for a child with special needs during the September Holidays. In 2012, Churchie won the Queensland Community Foundation's Corporate Community Philanthropist of the Year Award for donating over $2 million over the past two decades to charitable foundations.

House system
As with most Australian schools, Churchie uses a house system. Each student is a member of one of its eleven houses, and competes in inter-house events. Churchie's inter-house competition includes swimming, cross-country, track and field, trivia, lightning chess and singing. Points are awarded based on a house's participation and position. In addition to the Inter-House Cup awarded at the end of the year, shields are awarded to the house that comes first in each event. Canon Morris started Churchie's house system in 1935.

Day houses
Day students from the middle and senior schools belong to one of nine-day houses. (The preparatory school has four houses, all of which are day houses: Jutes, Angles, Saxons and Danes.)
Biggs
Biggs house was named after E.E. Biggs, a member of the first school council. He attended the school from 1918 to 1923. The Biggs family's association with the school continues to the present day. The house motto is Semper Conemur ("Always Striving"). Colours: blue and white.

Casey
Casey house was founded in 1971 and named in honour of Richard Gardiner Casey (1890–1976), later Baron Casey of Berwick, a distinguished Australian diplomat, politician and Governor-General of Australia. The house motto, Vis et Unitas, is usually translated as "Progress Through Unity". The house coat of arms incorporates themes from Casey's own coat of arms, with the addition of the crossed Viking swords. Colours: gold and royal purple (Baron Casey's own colours).

Grenfell
Grenfell, founded in 1935, was one of the first four-day houses at Churchie. It was named after Sir Wilfred Thomasson Grenfell, who was born at Parkgate, England, in 1865. Grenfell was a doctor whose love of the sea and interest in boating led him to becoming a master mariner. A lecturer of his suggested he join a large fishing fleet as their doctor. Within five years he had encouraged the fishermen to stop drinking alcohol and Queen Victoria's interest in his successful persuasion of the crew led to her presenting the fleet with its first hospital boat. In 1891, Grenfell sailed to Cape St. John in the North Atlantic. He was mobbed by people who needed medical attention. The following spring he returned to Labrador with two doctors and nurses, where he set up two hospital bases for the Eskimos who populated Labrador. A third hospital was set up at St. Anthony in about 1898. Sir Wilfred Grenfell gave the school permission to use his personal motto, Loyal Devoir, and coat of arms when the house was established. Colours: red and gold.

Hillary
Hillary house was named by the late headmaster Charles Fisher, who looked for men who had achieved success in their chosen field. He chose Sir Edmund Hillary, who, in 1953, was one of the first men ever to climb Mount Everest. The house colours and crest were chosen by the first students of Hillary from designs submitted by students. The crest incorporated the symbols of knighthood—a knight's helmet, a castle, and a fist pointing upward. The house motto is Semper Sursum ("Ever Upward"). Colours: black and gold.

Kingsley
Kingsley was one of the original four houses. It held both day and boarding students until 1950, when the two boarding houses were created. In 1971, Kingsley House was divided to create Biggs and Hillary houses. Canon Morris chose Charles Kingsley, a man he considered a Christian with a Viking's courage, as the house's patron. History revealed Charles Kingsley to have been a man who practiced his Christian beliefs and followed his social conscience to help the less fortunate, with whom he chose to live. The Kingsley house motto, Age Quod Agis, translates loosely as "Do What You Do Well". Colours: black and white.

Magnus
Magnus was one of the original four-day houses. The house is named after St Magnus, Churchie's patron saint. The house's coat of arms is a simple shield with St. Magnus holding a sword and a palm of martyrdom. This image of St Magnus is from a stained-glass window in St Magnus Cathedral in Orkney and dates back probably to the thirteenth century. The house motto is Sibi Fidelis ("Be Faithful To Oneself"). Colours: maroon and royal blue.

Mansfield
Mansfield was named after Sir Alan Mansfield, a distinguished barrister and former judge, Chief Justice and Governor of Queensland. Sir Alan attended the school when it was known as St. Magnus Hall. The house crest borrows heavily from the Mansfield family coat of arms. The house motto is "Steadfast". Colours: white and blue.

Mawson
Mawson house was named after Sir Douglas Mawson, a distinguished geologist and Antarctic explorer, who became famous for his discovery of the South Magnetic Pole in 1908 and his ill-fated second journey to Antarctica in 1911. He continued to visit and explore Antarctica up until 1931. The house motto is Alis Austri ("On the Wings of the South Wind"). The Mawson coat of arms includes the vessel Mawson used on his voyages south and the Southern Cross. Colours: red and green.

Nansen
Nansen was one of the original four houses, named after Fridtjof Nansen, a scientist, explorer and humanitarian. The Nansen house crest was established at Churchie in 1938; inscribed on the crest is the motto Fram, which means "Forward". Colours: green and white.

Boarding houses
There are two boarding houses, both based on the school grounds.

Gerald
Gerald house was opened in 1934, as the need for new boarding accommodation grew. Prior to 1959, boarders took part in competitive sport as members of a day house. This changed in 1950, when the boarding houses became sporting competitors in their own right. The house was named after Gerald Sharp, Archbishop of Brisbane (1921–1933). The house crest shows the Bishop's mitre which symbolises the connection with Archbishop Sharp; the large star signifies God; the two smaller stars king and country, and the five small stars signify truth, honesty, duty, comradeship, and charity. The house's motto is Fideliter Et Constanter, meaning "Faithfully and Constantly". Colours: green and yellow.

Goodwin
Goodwin house was opened in 1928, and named after Lieutenant General Sir John Goodwin, most famous for his medical work in World War I. Goodwin took interest in the progress of the school while he was Governor of Queensland. The house motto is Fide et Virtute, meaning "By Faith and Courage". The Goodwin house crest is the family crest of Sir John Goodwin, who suggested it be adopted by the house when he granted permission for it to be named Goodwin. Colours: red and gold.

Former houses
In 2006, Churchie lessened the number of school houses in the inter-house competition. Five houses—three-day and two boarding—were abolished, reducing the total number of houses from sixteen to eleven. The three-day houses removed were Alban (dark blue and sky blue), Schonell (red and blue) and Halse (gold and light green). Donaldson (blue and gold) and Strong (gold and black) are the two former boarding houses.

Student bodies and leadership groups
A number of student and leadership groups exist at the school. The Prefect Body is a group of seniors selected by the students and teachers of the school to lead the student body in all aspects of Churchie life. It is led by the three school vice-captains and the School Captain, who are collectively known as the Student Executive. The Head Boarder is the leader of the boarding students. The Student Council is a student organisation, led by the Speaker of the House (a school vice-captain) and the two managers-of-business, consisting of the assembly and the cabinet. Service Coordinators is a group of seniors selected within their houses and led by the President of Service who encourage service within the school.

Since 2008, boys in Year Nine must participate either in weekly community service, scouting or the Tri-Service Cadets program. Boys must commit to these until the end of Year Nine. The school also operates the Duke of Edinburgh's Awards and in November 2014, Prince Edward, accompanied by Governor of Queensland Paul de Jersey, visited the school to promote the award as part of an Australian tour.

Notable alumni

Alumni of Anglican Church Grammar School are known as 'Old Boys', and may elect to join the school's alumni association, the Churchie Old Boys' Association. Notable Churchie Old Boys include:

Public service and the law

 Paul de Jersey, AC, QC – Former Governor of Queensland (2014–2021) and Chief Justice of Queensland (1998–2014)
 Sir Alan Mansfield, KCMG, KCVO – former Chief Justice of Queensland (1956–1966), Governor of Queensland (1966–1972) and Chancellor of the University of Queensland (1966–1976)
 Walter Sofronoff QC – President of the Queensland Court of Appeal (2017–) and former Solicitor-General of Queensland (2005–2014)
 David Thomas – Judge of the Federal Court of Australia and President of the Administrative Appeals Tribunal (2017–)
 Hugh Fraser – Judge of the Queensland Court of Appeal (2008–)
 David North, SC – Judge of the Supreme Court of Queensland (2011–)
 John Helman – former Judge of the Supreme Court of Queensland (1994–2007)
 Tom Shepherdson – former Judge of the Supreme Court of Queensland (1982–2000)
 Kenneth Mackenzie (judge) – former Judge of the Supreme Court of Queensland (1989–2008)
 Peter Tesch – Australian Ambassador to Russia (2016–) and former Ambassador to Kazakhstan and Germany
 Peter Dunning QC – Solicitor-General of Queensland (2014–)
 Alex Freeleagus, AO, CBE, AM (Mil), RFD – Honorary Consul-General of Greece in Queensland (1957–2005) and noted Queensland solicitor
 Malcolm Hazell, CVO, AM – former Official Secretary to two Governors-General of Australia, Peter Hollingworth (2003) and Major-General Michael Jeffery (2003–2008)
 David Russell, AM, RFD, QC – Queensland barrister and prominent figure in the National Party of Australia
 Bill Glasson, AO – former president of the Australian Medical Association (2003–2005)

Politics

 Tim Nicholls – former Treasurer of Queensland (2012–2015), former Leader of the Opposition (2016–2017) and current LNP Member for Clayfield (2006–)
 Cameron Dick – former Attorney-General of Queensland, Minister for Industrial Relations of Queensland and Minister for Education of Queensland (2009–2011); current Minister of Health of Queensland and Minister of Ambulance Services of Queensland (2015–)
 Andrew Laming MP – Liberal Member for Bowman (2004–) and Director of Funding for the Liberal Party of Australia
 Clem Jones, AO – Longest-serving Lord Mayor of Brisbane, Queensland (1961–1975)
 Sam Cox MP – former Queensland LNP member for Thuringowa (2012–2015)
 Dr. Christian Rowan MP – former President of the Queensland branch of the Australian Medical Association (2013–2014) and current LNP member for Moggill (2015–)
 Bruce Scott MP – National Party Member for Maranoa (1990–) and Deputy Speaker of the Australian House of Representatives (2011–)
 Ian Walker MP – LNP member for Mansfield (2012–2017) and former Minister for Science, Information Technology, Innovation and the Arts of Queensland (2013–2015)
 David Jull – Long-serving Liberal member for Bowman (1975–1983) and Fadden (1984–2007) in the Australian House of Representatives
 Jim Samios, AM, MBE – former Deputy Leader of the Liberal Party in the New South Wales Legislative Council (1995–2003)
 Neil Symes MP – former Queensland LNP Member for Lytton (2012–2015)
 Harold Lowes – former Queensland lawyer and Liberal Member for Brisbane in the Legislative Assembly of Queensland (1974–1977)
 Donald Cameron, AM – Queensland politician who represented Griffith (1966–1977), Fadden (1977–1983) and Moreton (1983–1990) in the Australian House of Representatives
 Graham Freudenberg, AM – Author and political speechwriter for leaders of the Australian Labor Party

Business and philanthropy
 Don Argus, AC –  Former Chairman of BHP (1999–2010), National Australia Bank (1990–1999) and Brambles (1999–2008)
 Leigh Clifford, AO – former CEO of the Rio Tinto (2000–2007) and Chairman of Qantas (2007–2018)
 The Rev. Keith Rayner, AO – former Archbishop of Melbourne (1990–1999) and Anglican Primate of Australia
 Sir John Pidgeon – Queensland property developer
 Graham Fowles – Founder of Fowles, Australia's largest auction house
 Marcus Blackmore, AM – Chairman of Blackmore's Australia

Entertainment, media and the arts

 Peter Porter, OAM – Poet and 2004 candidate for Professor of Poetry at the University of Oxford
 Jeffrey Black – Opera singer
 Garth Welch – Ballet dancer and choreographer
 John Meehan – Artistic director and former ballet dancer
 Stephen Page – Indigenous dance choreographer and artistic director of the Bangarra Dance Theatre
 Simon Gallaher – Singer, actor, pianist, theatre director and theatrical producer
 Gyton Grantley – Actor
 John McCallum, AO, CBE – Actor and producer, highly successful in Britain
 Karl Stefanovic – Gold Logie winning television presenter and Australian media personality
 John Schluter – Presenter for Seven News
 James Swanwick – Anchor of SportsCenter on ESPN
 Donald Crombie – Film and television director
 Nick Earls – Award-winning Australian author
 Grant McLennan – Singer-songwriter and founding member of the alternative rock band The Go-Betweens
 Mike Chapman – Record producer and songwriter in Britain, prominent during the 1970s
 Philip Lindsay – Australian writer and historical novelist and the son of Norman Lindsay
 Dene Olding – Violinist, concertmaster and conductor
 Sam Cranstoun – Australian artist twice shortlisted for the Archibald Prize
 David Denholm, author

Academia and education
 Alistair Cameron Crombie – former historian of science at the University of Oxford and Fellow (subsequently Honorary Fellow) of Trinity College, Oxford
 Richard Leftwich – Fuji Bank and Heller Professor of Accounting and Finance at the University of Chicago Booth School of Business and a former Marvin Bower Fellow at the Harvard Business School
 Sam Hawgood – Chancellor of the University of California, San Francisco
 Franklin White – President, Canadian Public Health Assoc.(1986–88); Medal of Honor (1997) Pan-American Health Organization; endowed chair Dalhousie University (1982–89) and Aga Khan University (1998–2003)
 Mervyn Meggitt – Anthropologist who specialised in the study of Papua New Guinean and Aboriginal Australian cultures
 Cecil Pearce (former headmaster), OBE – former Headmaster of The Southport School (1950–1971)

Sport

 David Pocock – Player for the Brumbies and the Wallabies
 Quade Cooper – Player for the Queensland Reds and the Wallabies
 Karmichael Hunt – Player for the Queensland Reds; former player for the Brisbane Broncos and the Gold Coast Suns
 Jake Schatz – Player for the Queensland Reds
 Aidan Toua – Player for the Brumbies
 Michael Gunn – Player for the Queensland Reds
 Cameron Bairstow – Player for The Hawks
 Jarred Bairstow – Player for the Perth Wildcats
 Jaydn Su'A – Player for the South Sydney Rabbitohs
 Kalyn Ponga – Player for Newcastle Knights
 Brodie Croft – Player for the Melbourne Storm
Mack Mason – Player for NSW Waratahs
Isaia Perese – Player for Queensland Reds and Brisbane Broncos
James Grant (rugby) – Former Dalby Wheatmen Rugby Player
 Henry Taefu – Player for the Queensland Reds
 Tim Walsh – former player for the Queensland Reds
 Lloyd McDermott – Australia's second Indigenous Wallaby and first Indigenous barrister
 Robbie Russell – former player for the Scotland national rugby union team
 Junior Rasolea – Player for the Western Force
Tom Hockings – Played for the Western Force
Tom McQueen – Player for the Hong Kong Sevens team
 Keith Bell – former player for the Wallabies
 Walter Bennett – former player for the Wallabies
 Gavan Horsley – former player for the Wallabies
 Kerry Larkin – former player for the Wallabies
 David Rathie – former rugby union player for the Wallabies and cricketer for the Queensland Bulls
 Ric Trivett – former player for the Wallabies
 Jason Dunstall – former AFL player with Hawthorn
 Scott Harding – former AFL and American football player
 Jonathan McKain – former player for Adelaide United and the Socceroos
 Nathan Coe – Goalkeeper for Melbourne Victory and the Socceroos
 Steve Hogg – former player for the Socceroos
 Regan Harrison – former Australian breaststroke swimmer and silver medallist at the 2000 Summer Olympics
 Stephen Holland, OAM – Teenage freestyle swimmer who won medals at the 1974 Commonwealth Games and the 1976 Olympic Games, who broke twelve world records in a three-year career
 Peter Burge, AM – former Australian test cricketer and match referee
 Ron Archer, AM – former test cricketer
 Ken Archer, AM – former test cricketer and media executive
 Tony Dell – former test cricketer
 Dennis Lillie – former Queensland cricketer
 Ryan Broad – Professional cricketer for the Queensland Bulls
 Ben McDermott – Professional cricketer for the Queensland Bulls
 John Cuneo – Gold medal-winning sailor at the 1972 Summer Olympics and challenger in the 1974 America's Cup
 Peter Shakespear – Two-time Olympic rower and Olympic gold, silver and bronze medal-winning rowing coach
 Jared Bidwell – Australian rower
 Joshua Jefferis – Olympic artistic gymnast and medallist at the 2006 and 2010 Commonwealth Games
 Chilla Porter – Olympic-medal winning high jumper and medallist at the 1958 and 1962 Commonwealth Games
 Allen Crawley – Olympic long jumper
 John Millman – Professional tennis player
 Ian Ayre – former Australian tennis player
 James Giltrow – Australian light middleweight boxer
 David Smerdon – Australian chess grandmaster
 Clint Steindl – Australian basketball player with the Cairns Taipans
 Zac Stubblety-Cook – Gold medal-winning swimmer at the 2020 Summer Olympics

Military
 Major General Mike Hindmarsh, AO, DSC, CSC (Retired) –  Former Australian Special Operations Commander (2004–2008) and current Commander of the Presidential Guard in the UAE Armed Forces
 Captain Bryce Duffy – Australian soldier killed on operations in Afghanistan in October 2011
Galfry Gatacre  (1907–1983), Royal Australian Navy rear admiral and first-class cricketer

Notable teachers
A number of notable individuals have taught at the school over the years. Some current and former teachers include:
 Richard Stone – former Olympic fencer and sports master at the school
 Michael Brimer – South African pianist, organist, conductor, composer and music master at Churchie in the 1950s
 Mel Johnson – Cricket umpire and former Australian test cricketer
 Dirk Wellham – former Australian One Day International and test cricketer
 Ian Greig – former England cricketer, player for the Cambridge University Rugby Union Football Club and brother of former England captain and commentator Tony Greig
 John Hipwell, OAM – former Wallabies scrum-half and Australian Rugby Union Hall of Fame Member
 Cheryl Kernot – former Leader the Australian Democrats and Queensland Senator (1990–1997).

Further reading
 Hempenstall, P. (2011). Churchie A Centenary Portrait. Brisbane: The Anglican Church Grammar School
 Mason, J. (2011). Churchie The Centenary Register. Brisbane: The Anglican Church Grammar School
 Mason, J. (2017). A Pictorial History of Churchie – Celebrating 100 Years of Old Boys. Brisbane: The Anglican Church Grammar School
 Mason, J. (2015). The Field of Honour. Brisbane: The Anglican Church Grammar School

See also

 Great Public Schools Association of Queensland
 Lists of schools in Queensland
 List of boarding schools

References

External links

  
 Churchie Old Boys website
 Churchie Emerging Art website

Educational institutions established in 1912
Boarding schools in Queensland
Anglican high schools in Brisbane
Anglican primary schools in Brisbane
Boys' schools in Queensland
Grammar schools in Australia
Junior School Heads Association of Australia Member Schools
1912 establishments in Australia
Great Public Schools Association of Queensland